Satendra Maithri Gunaratne  was the  governor of the Central Province of Sri Lanka.

References

Living people
Year of birth missing (living people)
Governors of Central Province, Sri Lanka
Sinhalese civil servants